The 2012 Torneo Internazionale Regione Piemonte was a professional tennis tournament played on outdoor clay courts. It was the 13th edition of the tournament and was part of the 2012 ITF Women's Circuit. It took place in Biella, Italy between 2 and 8 July 2012.

WTA entrants

Seeds

 Rankings are as of June 25, 2012.

Other entrants
The following players received wildcards into the singles main draw:
  Maria Elena Camerin
  Irina Khromacheva
  Johanna Larsson
  Giulia Pairone

The following players received entry from the qualifying draw:
  Vesna Dolonc
  Valentyna Ivakhnenko
  Federica Di Sarra
  Laura Thorpe

The following player received entry from a Lucky loser spot:
  Mervana Jugić-Salkić

Champions

Singles

 Johanna Larsson def.  Anna Tatishvili, 6–3, 6–4

Doubles

 Eva Hrdinová /  Mervana Jugić-Salkić def.  Sandra Klemenschits /  Tatjana Malek, 1–6, 6–3, [10–8]

External links
Official website
ITF website

Torneo Internazionale Regione Piemonte
Clay court tennis tournaments
Torneo Internazionale Regione Piemonte